Fadhil is a given name. Notable people called Fadhil include:

Fadhil Ahmad al-Hayali (died 2015), the Islamic State of Iraq and the Levant (ISIL) governor for territories held by the organization in Iraq
Fadhil Al-Jamali, Iraqi politician, Iraqi foreign minister, and prime minister of Iraq from 1953 to 1954
Fadhil Assultani (born 1948), Iraqi poet and the literary editor of Asharq Al-Awsat
Fadhil Al Azzawi (born 1940), Iraqi poet and writer
Fadhil Chalabi (born 1929), Iraqi economist, Acting Secretary General of OPEC from 1983 to 1988
Abdullah Fadhil or William Richard Williamson, English adventurer who became an oil company representative in the Persian Gulf
Fadhil al-Manasif, photographer and member of the Saudi human rights organization Adala Center for Human Rights
Mustafa Mohamed Fadhil (1976–2001), indicted in the US for his part in US embassy bombings in Dar es Salaam, Tanzania, and Nairobi, Kenya
Syed Fadhil (born 1981), Singaporean footballer
Fadhil Haroun, member of al-Qaeda, and leader of its presence in East Africa
Fadhil Hashim (born 1983), Malaysian footballer
Fadhil Jalil al-Barwari (1966–2018), Iraqi military commander who was the head of the Iraqi Counter Terrorism Bureau
Fadhil Noh (born 1989), Singaporean footballer
Fadhil Omer, Iraqi Kurdistan politician
Fadhil Salim (born 1983), Singaporean goalkeeper
Fadhil Sausu (born 1985), Indonesian footballer

See also
Fahil